Rosemarie Crowley is an English female rugby union player. She represented  at the 2010 Women's Rugby World Cup. England were runners-up, losing to  10–13 in the final.

References

External links
Player Profile 

1980s births
Living people
England women's international rugby union players
English female rugby union players
Female rugby union players